WFC CSKA Moscow is the women's team of Russian football club PFC CSKA Moscow, itself a branch of sports society CSKA Moscow. The club participates in the Russian Women's Football Championship, the top division of Russian women football.

History
The section first competed in 1991, in the short-lived Soviet Championship's second level, as CSKA-Transexpo. Following the dissolution of the Soviet Union that same year, it registered in the Russian Supreme Division, where it competed for two seasons before it folded.

Two decades later, CSKA again registered in the second-tier Russian First League (women's football), but it was again disbanded after just one season. However, following the disbanding of Zorky Krasnogorsk near the end of the 2015 Top Division, FK Rossiyanka filled its vacancy for the next season and the new team was registered as CSKA in the 2016 championship. Its first game, a 1–1 draw against FK Chertanovo, coincided with the 93rd anniversary of the men's CSKA's first football match. CSKA ended the championship second-to-last, while Rossiyanka won its fifth title.

For the 2017 season, several key Rossiyanka players moved to the team, which rose to top-table positions. In July, during the inter-season summer pause, it became a CSKA official section. Two months later the team won its first title after defeating Chertanovo 1–0 in the Russian Cup final.

In recent years CSKA Women won two Russian championships in a row, in 2019 and 2020 and made their debut in UEFA Women's Champions League.

Season-by-season
List of WFC CSKA Moscow seasons

Titles
Russian championship
 Winners (2):  2019, 2020
 Runners-up (1):  2021
 Russian Women's Cup
 Winners (1):  2017
 Runners-up (1):  2020

Current squad

As of 31 January 2021.

See also
 WFC Rossiyanka

References

CSKA Moscow
Women's football clubs in Russia
Association football clubs established in 1990
Association football clubs disestablished in 1993
Association football clubs established in 2016
1990 establishments in Russia
1993 disestablishments in Russia
2016 establishments in Russia